Fernando Rubén Alarcón (born 16 June 1994) is an Argentine professional footballer who plays as a centre-back for Primera Division Argentina side Instituto.

Career
Alarcón moved into the Rosario Central first-team in May 2015, when he was an unused substitute for a Copa Argentina tie with Deportivo Riestra. Alarcón joined Deportivo Roca on loan on 8 July 2016, but returned to Argentine Primera División side Rosario Central later that month for personal reasons. He subsequently was loaned to fellow Primera División team Talleres in August. Despite remaining for the entire 2016–17 season, he failed to make an appearance for Talleres; appearing on the bench once. Back with Rosario Central in June 2017, he again left on loan in July to Villa Dálmine of Primera B Nacional.

He scored his first career goal versus Los Andes on 28 October 2017. Villa Dálmine extended his loan in June 2018.

Career statistics
.

References

External links

1994 births
Living people
People from General López Department
Argentine footballers
Association football defenders
Argentine Primera División players
Torneo Federal A players
Primera Nacional players
Rosario Central footballers
Deportivo Roca players
Talleres de Córdoba footballers
Villa Dálmine footballers
Club Atlético Temperley footballers
Club Atlético Tigre footballers
Instituto footballers
Sportspeople from Santa Fe Province